William Spring may refer to:

Sir William Spring of Lavenham (died 1599), English MP for Suffolk in 1570
Sir William Spring of Pakenham (died 1637), High Sheriff of Suffolk
Sir William Spring, 1st Baronet (1613–1654), English MP for Bury St Edmunds and Suffolk in 1654
Sir William Spring, 2nd Baronet (1642–1684), English MP for Suffolk 1679–1684
Sir William Spring, 4th Baronet (1697–1736/7), English baronet
William Spring (British Army officer) (1769–c.1839), British Army officer